Ingrid Berghmans (born 24 August 1961 in Koersel), also known as Ingrid Vallot, is a judoka from Belgium who has eight times been named Belgian Sportswoman of the Year. A former world title holder, she is also an Olympic competitor. She won the gold medal in the –72 kg class at the 1988 Summer Olympics, where women's judo appeared as a demonstration sport for the first time.

She was married to fellow Belgian judoka Marc Vallot.

References

External links

 
 

1961 births
Living people
Belgian female judoka
Judoka at the 1988 Summer Olympics
Olympic judoka of Belgium
People from Beringen, Belgium
World judo champions
Sportspeople from Limburg (Belgium)
20th-century Belgian women